The 2011 FIFA Club World Cup (officially known as the FIFA Club World Cup Japan 2011 presented by Toyota for sponsorship reasons) was a football tournament that was played from 8 to 18 December 2011. It was the eighth edition of the FIFA Club World Cup, a FIFA-organised tournament between the winners of the six continental confederations as well as the host nation's league champions.

After the United Arab Emirates hosted the tournament in 2009 and 2010, hosting rights for the 2011 edition returned to Japan. During a visit to Japan on 23 May 2011, FIFA President Sepp Blatter confirmed that Japan would remain as hosts of the tournament despite the 2011 Tōhoku earthquake and tsunami.

Defending champions Internazionale did not qualify as they were eliminated in the quarter-finals of the 2010–11 UEFA Champions League. The eventual winners of that competition, Spanish club Barcelona, went on to win the Club World Cup, winning 4–0 in the semi-finals against Qatari club Al-Sadd before another victory by the same margin against Brazilian club Santos in the final.

Host bids
The FIFA Executive Committee appointed Japan as hosts for the 2011 and 2012 tournaments on 27 May 2008 during their meeting in Sydney, Australia.

Qualified teams

Match officials
Appointed referees are:

Squads

Each team had to submit a squad of 23 players, three of them goalkeepers.

Venues
Yokohama and Toyota were the two cities that served as venues for the 2011 FIFA Club World Cup.

Matches
A draw was held on 17 November in Nagoya to decide the "positions" of the three teams entering the quarter-finals: Al-Sadd (AFC), Espérance de Tunis (CAF), and Monterrey (CONCACAF).

If a match was tied after normal playing time:
For elimination matches, extra time would be played. If still tied after extra time, a penalty shoot-out would be held to determine the winner.
For the matches for fifth place and third place, no extra time would be played, and the match would go straight to a penalty shootout to determine the winner.

All times Japan Standard Time (UTC+09:00).

Play-off for quarter-finals

Quarter-finals

Match for fifth place

Semi-finals

Match for third place

Final

Goalscorers

Awards

References
Bibliography

Notes

External links

FIFA Club World Cup Japan 2011, FIFA.com
2011 FIFA Club World Cup Official Site (Archived)
FIFA Technical Report

 
2011
2011
2011 in association football
2011 in Japanese football
2011–12 in Spanish football
2011–12 in Qatari football
2011 in Brazilian football
2011–12 in New Zealand association football
2011–12 in Mexican football
2011–12 in Tunisian football